Chris Wingate (born 3 July 1994) is a Norwegian footballer who plays as a midfielder.

Career

Youth and college 
Wingate played youth football for Bærum SK, being a part of their famous boys' 1994 team, which included Marius Lundemo, Simen Juklerød, Daniel Granli, Markus Fjørtoft and Borger Thomas. He attended Sandvika Upper Secondary School.

Wingate played four years of college soccer at the University of New Hampshire between 2013 and 2016. He made a total of 70 appearances, scoring 13 and tallying 15 assists in his time at New Hampshire.

While at college, Wingate also appeared for Premier Development League side Seattle Sounders FC U-23 in 2016.

Professional

Philadelphia Union
On 17 January 2017, Wingate was selected in the third round (54th overall) in the 2017 MLS SuperDraft by New York City FC.

On 5 April 2017, Wingate signed with Philadelphia Union's United Soccer League affiliate club Bethlehem Steel FC. He was released by Bethlehem Steel on 2 November 2017.

References

External links 
 
 

1994 births
Living people
Sportspeople from Bærum
Norwegian footballers
Norwegian expatriate footballers
Norwegian expatriate sportspeople in the United States
New Hampshire Wildcats men's soccer players
Seattle Sounders FC U-23 players
Philadelphia Union II players
Association football midfielders
New York City FC draft picks
USL League Two players
USL Championship players